Margaret of Scotland (Old Norse: Margrét Alexandersdóttir; Norwegian: Margrete Alexandersdotter; Scottish Gaelic: Maighread Nic Rìgh Alasdair; 28 February 1261 – 9 April 1283) was Queen of Norway as the wife of King Eric II. She is sometimes known as the Maid of Scotland to distinguish her from her daughter, Margaret, Maid of Norway, who succeeded to the throne of Scotland.

Early life 
Margaret was born on 28 February 1261 at Windsor Castle. She was the firstborn child of King Alexander III of Scotland and Margaret of England, Alexander's first wife. A committee of five earls, four bishops, and four barons were tasked with ensuring that the King's firstborn child was brought safely to Scotland. She was followed by two brothers, Alexander and David. Queen Margaret (of England) died in 1275, but letters written by the younger Margaret point to an affectionate relationship with her uncle King Edward I of England.

Queen of Norway

Margaret stayed unmarried until the age of 20, which is remarkably long for a medieval princess. She was finally betrothed to Eric II, king of Norway, in 1281. The intent was to ease the tensions that developed between Norway and Scotland in the previous decades. According to chroniclers, Margaret was against the match, but her father insisted. The Scottish crown gave her and Eric the estates of Rothiemay in Banffshire, Belhelvie in Aberdeenshire, Bathgate in West Lothian, and Ratho in Midlothian as her dowry. The treaty arranging the marriage specified that Margaret and her children would succeed to the throne of Scotland if King Alexander died leaving no legitimate sons and if no legitimate son of his left legitimate children.

Margaret sailed into the port of Bergen in the early morning of 15 August. Her marriage to the 13-year-old king of Norway was celebrated two or three weeks later, making her queen of Norway. She was crowned by Jon Raude, Archbishop of Nidaros, Christ Church, Bergen. A cultured woman, Margaret probably found it difficult to adapt to married life with an uncultured adolescent. Scots reported that she tried to "cultivate" Eric by teaching him French and English, table manners, and fashion. Her mother-in-law, Ingeborg of Denmark, undermined her position as queen and dominated the court.

Between March and 9 April 1283, Queen Margaret gave birth to her only child, Margaret, known as the Maid of Norway, in Tønsberg. She died during or shortly after childbirth, and was buried in Christ Church in Bergen. As Margaret's brothers both predeceased her father, her daughter succeeded to the Scottish throne in 1286.

References

Sources

Further reading

1261 births
1283 deaths
Deaths in childbirth
Norwegian royal consorts
Scottish princesses
House of Dunkeld
Heirs to the Scottish throne
Burials at Christ Church, Bergen
Norway–Scotland relations
House of Sverre
13th-century Scottish people
13th-century Scottish women
13th-century Norwegian people
13th-century Norwegian women
Daughters of kings